Swallow was launched in France in 1793. After her capture circa 1797, she became a slave ship, sailing from London in the triangular trade in enslaved people. She first appeared in Lloyd's Register (LR) in 1797 with T. Wilson, master and owner, and trade Liverpool–Africa.

Captain Thomas Wilson sailed from London on 6 July 1797. Swallow acquired her captives at the Congo River and landed 218 captives at Grenada on 6 April 1798. She then disappears from currently available records.

Citations

1793 ships
Ships built in France
Captured ships
Age of Sail merchant ships of England
London slave ships